The Old Maid's Valentine is a 1900 British short  silent comedy film, directed by George Albert Smith, which features the titular Miss Pimple receiving an unpleasant surprise on 14 February. The film, according to Michael Brooke of BFI Screenonline, "is essentially a facial - a medium close-up shot of a single performer whose changing expression constitutes virtually all the film's dramatic action." David Fisher points out that, "the flapping of the sheet of paper and the movement of the calendar betray the open-air set," which, "makes it difficult to read the message: Just like Mama," whilst, "the remarkably well-behaved cat," which, "sits patently licking its paws," "suggests that Smith may have already learned the trick of smearing the cat's fur with food."

References

External links 
 
 Full movie on YouTube

1900 films
1900s British films
British silent short films
1900 comedy films
1900 short films
Films directed by George Albert Smith
Articles containing video clips
British comedy short films
British black-and-white films
Valentine's Day in films
Silent comedy films